Julian Edward Hochberg (July 10, 1923 – May 22, 2022) was an American psychology researcher and the Centennial Professor Emeritus of Psychology at Columbia University. Much of Hochberg's research involved visual perception. Before coming to Columbia, Hochberg taught at Cornell University and New York University. He was a member of the National Academy of Sciences.

Biography
Hochberg was born on July 10, 1923. A native of New York City, he attended City College of New York and graduated in 1945 with an undergraduate degree in physics. At City College, Hochberg was influenced by studying perception with psychologist Gardner Murphy. He received a Ph.D. in psychology from the University of California, Berkeley. At Berkeley, he was taught by influential figures like Edward Tolman, Egon Brunswik, and Gordon Lynn Walls.

He was a professor at New York University between 1965 and 1969 before moving to Columbia University, where he finished his teaching career.

Research
In the 1950s, Hochberg led a study that examined how college students judged qualities like cuteness and intelligence based on physical features. The study, which was funded by the National Science Foundation and the Office of Naval Research, found that college students studied in the same year showed consistency in judging facial expressions, but students from a given year tended not to agree with students studied in other years. This suggested that over time there are trends in judging people. Hochberg found that there was an exception to the discrepancies seen in students from different years: judgments of the cuteness of babies tended to remain stable over time.

Personal life
Hochberg died on May 22, 2022, at the age of 98.

Honors and awards
Hochberg received the APA Award for Distinguished Scientific Contributions to Psychology from the American Psychological Association. He was elected to the National Academy of Sciences in 1980. In 2000, he received the Howard Crosby Warren Medal from the Society of Experimental Psychologists.

References

Further reading
In the Mind's Eye: Julian Hochberg on the Perception of Pictures, Films, and the World. Oxford University Press, 2007.

1923 births
2022 deaths
Experimental psychologists
City College of New York alumni
Columbia University faculty
Members of the United States National Academy of Sciences
Fellows of the American Academy of Arts and Sciences
Fellows of the American Association for the Advancement of Science
Cornell University faculty
University of California, Berkeley alumni
People from New York City